The AirPort Extreme is a residential gateway combining the functions of a router, network switch,  wireless access point and NAS as well as varied other functions, and one of Apple's former AirPort products. The latest model, the 6th generation, supports 802.11ac networking in addition to older standards. Versions of the same system with a built-in network-accessible hard drive are known as the AirPort Time Capsule.

Apple discontinued developing its lineup of wireless routers in 2016, but  continues limited hardware and software support.

History
The name "AirPort Extreme" originally referred to any one of Apple's AirPort products that implemented the (then) newly introduced 802.11g Wi-Fi standard, differentiating it from earlier devices that ran the slower 802.11a and b standards. At that time the gateway part of this lineup was known as the AirPort Extreme Base Station. With the addition of the even faster Draft-N standards in early 2009 this naming was dropped, and from then on only the gateway has been known as the AirPort Extreme. Several minor upgrades followed, mostly to change antenna and power in the Wi-Fi. In 2013, a major upgrade added 802.11ac support and more internal antennas.

The AirPort Extreme has gone through three distinct physical forms. The earliest models were packaged similar to the original AirPort Base Station, in a round housing known as the "flying saucer". From 2007 to 2013 the Extreme was packaged in a rounded-rectangle white plastic housing, similar in layout and size to the Mac mini or earlier Apple TVs. The 2013 802.11ac model was re-packaged into a more vertical case, taller than it is square.

Discontinuation
In approximately 2016, Apple disbanded the wireless router team that developed the AirPort Time Capsule and AirPort Extreme router. In 2018, Apple formally discontinued both products, exiting the router market. Bloomberg News noted that "Apple rarely discontinues product categories" and that its decision to leave the business was "a boon for other wireless router makers."

Features

Overview
 Fully featured 802.11ac Wi-Fi base station
 Sleep Proxy Service
 4 Ethernet ports (3 LAN ports, 1 WAN port) — all ports are gigabit Ethernet on newer versions
 USB 2.0 interface for disk and printer sharing
 Built-in file server (AFP and SMB)
 Runs VxWorks Operating System by WindRiver or a customized version of NetBSD.

AirPort Disk
The AirPort Disk feature allows users to plug a USB hard drive into the AirPort Extreme for use as a network-attached storage (NAS) device for Mac OS X and Microsoft Windows clients. Users may also connect a USB hub and printer. The performance of USB hard drives attached to an AirPort Extreme is slower than if the drive were connected directly to a computer. This is due to the processor speed on the AirPort Extreme. Depending on the setup and types of reads and writes, performance ranges from 0.5 to 17.5 MB/s for writing and 1.9 to 25.6 MB/s for reading. Performance for the same disk connected directly to a computer would be 6.6 to 31.6 MB/s for writing and 7.1 to 37.2 MB/s for reading. NTFS-formatted drives are not supported.

Models by generation

Original generation
The original AirPort Extreme Base Station was so named because of its support for the 802.11g standard of the day, as well as for its ability to serve up to 50 Macs or PCs simultaneously. One feature found in most models of this generation was an internal 56K dial-up modem, allowing homes that lacked a broadband connection to enjoy wireless connectivity, albeit at dial-up speeds. It was the last generation to retain the "flying saucer" form factor. Later generations would adopt the short, rounded-square form factor that would be seen until 2013.

1st generation
On January 9, 2007 the AirPort Extreme began shipping, with support for 802.11n draft specification, and built-in wireless print and storage server.

2nd generation
On March 19, 2008, Apple released a firmware update for both models of the AirPort Extreme that, according to third-party reports, allowed AirPort Disks to be used in conjunction with Time Machine, similar to the functionality provided by AirPort Time Capsule.

3rd generation
On March 3, 2009, Apple unveiled a new AirPort Extreme with simultaneous dual-band 802.11 Draft-N radios. This allowed full 802.11 Draft-N 2x2 communication in both 802.11 Draft-N bands at the same time.

4th generation
On October 20, 2009, Apple unveiled an updated AirPort Extreme with antenna improvements.

5th generation
On June 21, 2011, Apple unveiled an updated AirPort Extreme, referred to as AirPort Extreme 802.11n (5th Generation).

The detailed table of output power comparison between the 4th generation model MC340LL/A and the 5th generation model MD031LL/A can be seen below:

{| class="wikitable" border="1" style="text-align:center"
|-
!  Frequency range (MHz)
!  Mode
!  AirPort Extreme model
!  Output power (dBm)
!  Output power (mW)
!  Comparison (percent)
!  Difference (percent)
|-
|  rowspan="6"| 2412–2462
|  rowspan="2"| 802.11b
|  4th generation
|  24.57
|  286.42
|  100
|  rowspan="2" style="background:none; color:red"| -10.3
|-
|  5th generation
|  24.10
|  257.04
|  89.7
|-
|  rowspan="2"| 802.11g
|  4th generation
|  21.56
|  143.22
|  100
|  rowspan="2" style="background:none; color:green"| +114.8
|-
|  5th generation
|  24.88
|  307.61
|  214.8
|-
|  rowspan="2"| 802.11n HT20
|  4th generation
|  21.17
|  130.92
|  100
|  rowspan="2" style="background:none; color:green"| +96.8
|-
|  5th generation
|  24.11
|  257.63
|  196.8
|-
|  rowspan="2"| 5745–5825
|  rowspan="2"| 802.11a
|  4th generation
|  23.07
|  202.77
|  100
|  rowspan="2" style="background:none; color:green"| +61.1
|-
|  5th generation
|  25.14
|  326.59
|  161.1
|-
|  rowspan="2"| 5745–5805
|  rowspan="2"| 802.11n HT20
|  4th generation
|  22.17
|  164.82
|  100
|  rowspan="2" style="background:none; color:green"| +104.6
|-
|  5th generation
|  25.28
|  337.29
|  204.6
|-
|  rowspan="2"| 5755–5795
|  rowspan="2"| 802.11n HT40
|  4th generation
|  21.44
|  139.32
|  100
|  rowspan="2" style="background:none; color:green"| +181.8
|-
|  5th generation
|  25.94
|  392.64
|  281.8
|}
Note: A 3dB increase is equivalent to a doubling of power output.

6th generation
On June 10, 2013, Apple unveiled an updated AirPort Extreme, referred to as AirPort Extreme 802.11ac (6th Generation). The 6th generation AirPort Extreme (and 5th generation AirPort Time Capsule) featured three-stream 802.11ac Wi-Fi technology with a maximum data rate of 1.3Gbit/s, which is nearly three times faster than 802.11n. Time Machine was now supported using an external USB hard drive connected to AirPort Extreme (802.11ac model only).

Comparison chart

*802.11n draft-specification support in 1st- to 3rd-generation models.
**802.11ac draft-specification support in 6th-generation model.
***All models support IPv6 tunnel mode.
****Supported by Apple.

Discontinuation and support
According to a Bloomberg report on November 21, 2016, "Apple Inc. has disbanded its division that develops wireless routers, another move to try to sharpen the company’s focus on consumer products that generate the bulk of its revenue, according to people familiar with the matter."

In an April 2018 statement to 9to5Mac, Apple announced the discontinuation of its AirPort line, effectively leaving the consumer router market. Apple continued supporting the AirPort Extreme.

See also

List of router firmware projects
AirPort Express

Notes

Apple Inc. peripherals
Discontinued Apple Inc. products